Foreign domination is a term used in the historiography of multiple countries to characterize successive periods of rule by foreign powers.

China
China was under foreign rule in the years of the Yuan dynasty and of the Qing dynasty. Both dynasties however became gradually Chinese as time passed.

Italy 

Foreign domination is commonly used to describe the condition of foreign rule over Italian states at the beginning of the Risorgimento, when the only state left under local Italian rule was Piedmont-Sardinia (predecessor state of Italy) whereas much of the north was under the Habsburgs. All of Italy was organised in independent states from the 11th-12th century as a result of the Walk to Canossa and the Treaty of Venice, but this condition was gradually lost between the end of the Italian Wars and the balance of power established by the Congress of Vienna.

Spain
Two foreign dynasties came to power in Spain, the House of Habsburg in 1516 and the House of Bourbon in 1700. However, both the Spanish Habsburgs by the time of Philip II of Spain and the Spanish Bourbons by the time of Louis I of Spain were Spanish-born monarchs.

Other examples
The term has also notably been used to refer to periods of Israeli, Eastern European, and Polish history.

References

 

Geopolitical terminology
Historiography
Military occupation